Guardian (James Jacob "Jim" Harper) is a DC Comics superhero introduced in April 1942 by writer/artist Joe Simon and artist Jack Kirby.

Guardian resembles the earlier Kirby and Simon character Captain America (first published 13 months earlier by Marvel Comics), as he had no super powers and carried an indestructible shield. When Kirby returned to DC in 1970, he eventually re-established the character as a supporting one in the Superman franchise: as a clone who was head of security for Project Cadmus.

In the Arrowverse series Supergirl, James Olsen, portrayed by Mehcad Brooks, became the superhero Guardian. Additionally, James Harper appeared in the first season as a marine colonel portrayed by Eddie McClintock. In the sixth season, James Olsen’s sister Kelly became known as the Golden Guardian played by Azie Tesfai.

Publication history 
He first appeared in Star-Spangled Comics #7 (April 1942) and was created by Jack Kirby and Joe Simon.

Fictional character biography

Jim Harper

Jim Harper is a police officer in Metropolis' Suicide Slum who becomes a vigilante to catch crooks that the law could not prosecute, describing himself as guarding society from criminals. He was trained to fighting condition by ex-boxer Joe Morgan (the same man who trained two other mystery men, Wildcat and the first Atom). He doesn't have superpowers, but he carries a bulletproof shield.

He's aided by a group of boys known as the Newsboy Legion, to whom he is, literally, a guardian, having volunteered to take them in rather than allowing them to be sent to prison; he does so on the grounds that they're basically good kids who just needed a chance. The Legion grows up to become the heads of the Cadmus Project, subsequently saving Harper's life by transferring his mind from his old, dying body into a younger clone of himself.

It's later revealed that Jim Harper is the great-uncle of Roy Harper, who becomes Green Arrow's sidekick under the name of "Speedy".

Other relatives include his niece Roberta "Famous Bobby" Harper, who is briefly a member of the second Newsboy Legion and Jamie Harper, his grandniece working for the Gotham City Police Department. She works as Robin's personal contact in the GCPD, similar to the role Commissioner James Gordon plays for Batman. After helping Robin and Jason Bard expose two dirty cops in the GCPD, Jamie Harper is promoted to Detective Specialist and transfers to the Metropolis Science Police.

Golden Guardian
In Superman's Pal Jimmy Olsen #135 (January 1971), Jack Kirby reintroduces the boys of the now grown-up Newsboy Legion as supporting characters connected with the DNA Project (later Project Cadmus), a genetics research laboratory. One of the Project's experiments is a clone of the late Jim Harper, who takes up his predecessor's role, and becomes the Project's Head of Security as the Golden Guardian. Post-Crisis this character is simply known as the Guardian.

Harper remains Cadmus' Head of Security even after the former Newsboys leave. Eventually, he too is killed, although another clone is created and rapidly aged to adulthood, retaining all his predecessor's memories. This Guardian disappears along with the rest of Cadmus following an altercation with Amanda Waller and President Luthor, and his whereabouts are unknown.

Post-Infinite Crisis 
Following Infinite Crisis, the Guardian clone's backstory was retconned. As Dubbilex explains to Jimmy Olsen, Jim Harper was not killed in the line of duty, but shot by Cadmus' first head of security, Jonathan Drew, upon discovering the clone was already being created.

It's also revealed that the original Guardian clone had left Cadmus early on, and was now living in the town of Warpath on the Mexican border, where he assisted Sheriff Greg Saunders. Subsequent appearances of the Guardian had been new clones, each of which died within a year.

The original Guardian clone has decided to move to Metropolis with Gwen, his adopted daughter (in fact, an adolescent female clone of himself that he rescued), during the New Krypton storyline.

Science Police team leaders DuBarry and Daniels, along with several prison guards, are killed during the events of New Krypton when a team of Kandorians led by Commander Gor assault Stryker's Island and demand custody of Parasite. The Science Police Control 'Rachel' tasks Guardian to act as a liaison between the Metropolis Police Department and a coalition of superheroes in bringing justice for the fallen science police officers and prison guards. After the Kandorians leave Earth, Guardian is appointed Field Commander of the Science Police, as replacement for DuBarry and Daniels, due in part to his cloned memories of Jim Harper as a police officer and Guardian as a superhero. He is asked by Superman to help Mon-El, offering him a job with the Science Police and mentoring him on how to be a hero.

The issues of Detective Comics published during the One Year Later event reveals that Harper has a grandniece, Jamie, formerly a detective of Gotham City Police Department and an associate of Robin III.

The Guardian later travels to the JLA Watchtower to warn the Justice League after finding a teleportation device in Metropolis. While on the Watchtower, the heroes are attacked by Prometheus, who blinds the Guardian. In the aftermath of the attack, Guardian and Mon-El are recruited by Kimiyo Hoshi to join the Justice League. On his first and only mission with the team, the Guardian helps battle Doctor Impossible's gang of villains. After a mere three issues, the Guardian was written out of the book due to writer James Robinson's desire to work with a smaller cast.

Following the events of War of the Supermen, Harper abandons his role as the Guardian and takes Jamie (now pregnant with Mon-El's child) off to an unknown destination.

Mal Duncan

In Teen Titans #44 (November 1976), the previously uncostumed Titan Mal Duncan takes the name of the Guardian, wearing the original's outfit and an exoskeleton with strength augmenting abilities. The two Guardians finally meet in Superman Family #s 191-193 (Sept 78-Feb 79), when Mal helps rescue the Harper clone from Adam, an evil clone created using genetic material from both Harper and Dubbilex who have taken control of the DNA Project.

The Crisis on Infinite Earths removes Duncan's career as the Guardian, although he does appear briefly in his Guardian costume during the Crisis itself.

Jake Jordan

In 2005, Grant Morrison's Seven Soldiers megaseries introduced a new character based on the original Guardian, Jake Jordan the Manhattan Guardian.

Powers and abilities
The Guardian possesses exceptional combat and tactical skills. He was trained in many forms of fighting, and excelled at gymnastics, thinking quickly on his feet, and deduction. His only weapons are his golden helmet and shield. Guardian often used a customized motorcycle equipped with autopilot and a set of video cameras filming from various angles and recorded on videodisc.

The Harper clone possesses enhanced strength and reflexes, and an accelerated healing factor. The Harper clone's exact strength level is unknown but has demonstrated the ability to hurt Superboy (who he trained in hand-to-hand combat) and Kryptonians from Kandor. As an agent of Cadmus, Jim Harper also has access to the wondrous Whiz Wagon. The Hairies (a super-advanced tribe of techno-wizards, originally genetic creations of Donovan, who left Cadmus) built the Whiz Wagon to handle every situation. It can adapt to every terrain, fly, and even go underwater. The Wagon can be remote controlled or pre-programmed and is equipped with a set of powerful weapons and various gadgets.

Other versions
 In the Frank Miller graphic novel Batman: The Dark Knight Strikes Again, the Guardian is one of the superheroes killed by Dick Grayson. It is implied that he had a daughter with Lois Lane named Lana Harper-Lane, a television reporter.
 The Guardian's golden shield survives to the alternative future of the 853rd century; it is kept by that timeline's Batman.
 A bearded version of Guardian exists on the post-Flashpoint Earth-23 as a member of a predominantly African American Justice League.
 The Guardian makes a non-speaking cameo appearance in the final issue of The Golden Age. He is one of many heroes who tries and fails to fight the villainous Dynaman.

In other media

Television

Animation

The Jim Harper and Mal Duncan incarnations of Guardian appear in Young Justice.
 Jim Harper (voiced by Crispin Freeman) is a clone of Roy Harper created by the Light to serve their needs. Through programming and hypnosis, Jim operates as a superhero who believes he is Roy Harper's uncle while also working for Project Cadmus. Introduced in the two-part series premiere "Independence Day", Mark Desmond orders Dubbilex to mind control Jim and fend off Aqualad, Robin, and Kid Flash after the trio infiltrate Project Cadmus. After they find and release Superboy, Dubbilex frees Jim, who attempts to fight Desmond after he transforms into Blockbuster before Aqualad, Robin, Kid Flash, and Superboy defeat Desmond and the Justice League take him away. Following this, Jim vows to reform Project Cadmus. After learning of his true nature, Jim spends season two searching for Roy and taking part in an intervention for fellow clone, Red Arrow, before retiring the Guardian identity. As of Young Justice: Outsiders, Jim has formed a familial relationship with Red Arrow and Roy.
 Mal Duncan (voiced by Kevin Michael Richardson), a member of the Team, becomes the Guardian in the season two episode "Cornered" and continues to use the identity for the rest of the season.

Live-action

Several incarnations of Guardian appear in series set in the Arrowverse:
 James Harper appears in the Supergirl episode "Manhunter", portrayed by Eddie McClintock. This version is a colonel in the United States Marine Corps.
 With Winn Schott's help, James Olsen (portrayed by Mehcad Brooks) became the superhero Guardian.
 An alternate reality version of James Olsen / Guardian appears in "Crisis on Earth-X". This Guardian is a member of the Freedom Fighters from Earth-X who wears a costume patterned after the American flag. He is tasked with protecting a temporal gateway from the New Reichsmen, but is killed by Nazi Führer Oliver Queen.
 In the sixth season of Supergirl, James Olsen's sister Kelly Olsen (portrayed by Azie Tesfai) becomes the new Guardian.

Film
A character inspired by Guardian named Colonel Nathan Hardy appears in Man of Steel, portrayed by Christopher Meloni. He is a member of the United States Air Force who goes by the call sign "Guardian".

Miscellaneous
The Mal Duncan incarnation of Guardian makes non-speaking appearances in DC Super Hero Girls as a student of Super Hero High.

References

External links
 
 Guardian profile  at The Unofficial Guide to the DC Universe

Golden Age superheroes
Comics characters introduced in 1942
Fictional American police officers
Fictional shield fighters
Characters created by Jack Kirby
Characters created by Joe Simon
DC Comics characters with accelerated healing
Vigilante characters in comics